The Politbarometer (lit. political barometer) is a long-standing German election poll and television program on ZDF. The program is aired monthly, usually on Friday evenings. During the program, the survey results are presented. The survey is conducted since 1977 by Forschungsgruppe Wahlen (FGW).

The polling of the Politbarometer includes:

The "political mood" in Germany
The projection - "if next Sunday were federal elections" (lit. "Sunday question")
Ratings of the most important politicians
Survey on current topics from politics and business

Presenters

Current presenters
 since 2014: Matthias Fornoff
 since 2014: Antje Pieper (substitute)

Former presenters
 until 2010: Bettina Schausten
 2010–2014: Theo Koll
 Detlef Sprickmann
 Horst Schättle
 Klaus Bresser
 Klaus-Peter Siegloch
 Barbara Groth
 Thomas Bellut
 Ralph Schumacher (substitute)

Literature
 Andreas M. Wüst (ed.): Politbarometer. Leske + Budrich, Opladen 2003.

External links
Official page of Forschungsgruppe Wahlen
Official page of Politbarometer at ZDF.de

ZDF original programming
German television news shows
1977 German television series debuts
1980s German television series
1990s German television series
2000s German television series
2010s German television series
German-language television shows
Opinion polling in Germany